Ndom is a language spoken on Yos Sudarso Island in Papua province, Indonesia. It is reported to have numbers in senary (base 6). A problem from the 2007 International Linguistics Olympiad focused on this number system.

References

External links 
 The Number system of Ndom
Ndom. New Guinea World.

Languages of western New Guinea
Kolopom languages